The 2004–05 Egyptian Super Cup was the fourth Egyptian Super Cup, an annual football match contested by the winners of the previous season's Egyptian Premier League and Egypt Cup competitions, Al Mokawloon Al Arab won the game 4–2.

Match details

References
 http://www.angelfire.com/ak/EgyptianSports/ZamalekinEgyptSuperCup.html#2003/2004
 http://www.footballdatabase.eu/football.coupe.zamalek.moqaouloun-el-arab.127518.en.html

Egyptian Super Cup
Super Cup
Egyptian Super Cup
Egyptian Super Cup